Avgi is a village in the Ellispontos municipal unit, Kozani regional unit, Greece.

References 

Populated places in Kozani (regional unit)